In Person is a live album recorded by Ray Charles on May 28, 1959 on a rainy night  in Atlanta, Georgia at Morris Brown College's Herndon Stadium. All tracks from this album together with those from Ray Charles at Newport were also released on the 1987 Atlantic compilation CD, Ray Charles Live.

The album was recorded by the concert sponsor, radio station WAOK. The station's lead disk jockey, Zenas "Daddy" Sears, recorded the album from the audience using a single microphone.  The album is noted for its technical excellence in balancing band, singer, and audience, and also for its documentation of the jazzy R&B Ray Charles sound prior to his great crossover success. The album was inducted into the Grammy Hall of Fame in 1999.

Track listing
"The Right Time" (Lew Herman, Nappy Brown, Ozzie Cadena)
"What'd I Say" (Ray Charles)
"Yes, Indeed" (Sy Oliver)
"The Spirit Feel" (Milt Jackson)
"Frenesi" (Alberto Domínguez)
"Drown In My Own Tears" (Henry Glover)
"Tell The Truth" (Lowman Pauling)

Personnel
 Ray Charles – keyboards, vocals
 Marcus Belgrave – trumpet
 John Hunt – trumpet
 David "Fathead" Newman – tenor saxophone, alto saxophone
 Hank Crawford – alto saxophone, baritone saxophone
 Edgar Willis – bass
 Teagle Fleming – drums
 Marjorie Hendricks – vocals on "The Right Time" and "Tell The Truth"
 The Raelettes – backing vocals 

The track "Yes, Indeed" was recorded live at the Newport Jazz Festival on July 5, 1958, with Lee Harper replacing John Hunt on trumpet and Richie Goldberg replacing Teagle Fleming on drums.
Technical
Ivan Miles - recording engineer
Lee Friedlander - cover photography

References
 Atlantic Records 8039

Grammy Hall of Fame Award recipients
Ray Charles live albums
1959 live albums
Atlantic Records live albums